Ludwig is a surname of German origin. It is derived from the Old High German given name Ludwig, which means "famous warrior". As a surname, Ludwig may refer to:

Albert Ludwig (1919–2019), Canadian politician
Alexander Ludwig (born 1992), Canadian actor
Alice Ludwig (1910–1973), German film editor
Andy Ludwig (born 1964), American football coach
Bob Ludwig (born 1945), American sound engineer
Brandon Ludwig (born 1985), Canadian actor
Carl Ludwig (1816–1895), German physiologist
Cecilie Uttrup Ludwig (born 1995), Danish cyclist
Christa Ludwig (1928–2021), German singer
Christa Ludwig (writer) (born 1949) German writer
Christian Gottlieb Ludwig (1709–1773), German botanist
Craig Ludwig (born 1961), American ice hockey player
Daniela Ludwig (born 1975), German politician
Daniel K. Ludwig (1897–1992), American businessman
David Ludwig (composer) (born 1974), American composer
Duane Ludwig (born 1978), American mixed martial artist
Edmund V. Ludwig (1928–2016), American judge
Edward Ludwig (1899–1982), American film director
Elmar Ludwig (born 1935), German photographer 
Emil Ludwig (1881–1948), Swiss writer
Eugene Ludwig (born 1946), American banker
Franz Ludwig (1876–1927), German actor
Friedrich Ludwig (painter) (1895–1970), German painter
Friedrich Ludwig (botanist)  (1851–1918), German botanist
Friedrich Ludwig (musicologist) (1872–1930), German historian, musicologist, and college instructor
Geeske Ludwig (born 1967), Dutch cricketer
Hanna Ludwig (1918–2014), contralto and mezzo-soprano, and academic voice teacher
Jeanne Ludwig (1867–1898), French actress
Jens Ludwig (born 1977), German musician
Jens Ludwig (economist) (born 1968), American economist
Joe Ludwig (born 1959), Australian politician
Karen Ludwig (politician) (born 1964), Canadian politician
Karen Ludwig (actress) (born 1942), American actress and director
Ken Ludwig (born 1950), American playwright
Klaus Ludwig (born 1949), German race driver
Klaus Uwe Ludwig (1943–2019), German church musician, concert organist and composer
Max Ludwig (1896 –1957), German bobsledder
Max Ludwig (general) (1871-1961), German general
Mirko Ludwig (born 1961), German tenor
Laura Ludwig (born 1986), German beach volleyball player
Martha L. Ludwig (1931–2006), American scientist
Myrta Ludwig (1928–2003), Swiss chess master
Olaf Ludwig (born 1960), German cyclist
Otto Ludwig (writer) (1813–1865), German writer
Saskia Ludwig (born 1968), German politician
Spencer Ludwig (born 24 June 1990), American trumpeter
Vera Ludwig (born 1978), German poet
William Ludwig (screenwriter) (1912–1999), American writer
Wilhelm Ludwig (1901–1959), German zoologist and geneticist

See also
Ludwig
Ludwig (given name)

German-language surnames
Patronymic surnames
Surnames from given names